Penstemon barbatus, known by the common names golden-beard penstemon, and beardlip penstemon, is a flowering plant native to the western United States. In Spanish-speaking New Mexico and southern Colorado, it is called varita de San Jose "St. Joseph's staff".

The plant has spikes of clustered, tubular, scarlet blossoms with yellow hairs on their lower lip; the flowers are very attractive to hummingbirds. It is commonly grown in Xeriscape and conventional gardens, and several cultivars of different colors have been developed.

The late-summer flowering of Penstemon barbatus coincides with the southern migration of the Rufous hummingbird, and the hummingbirds use the Scarlet buglers as "filling stations" for their long trip south.

Uses
The Zuni people rub the chewed root of the torreyi subspecies over the rabbit stick to insure success in the hunt.

References

External links

Penstemon barbatus at Northern Arizona University

barbatus
Flora of the United States
Taxa named by Antonio José Cavanilles